Lawrence King Yount (born February 15, 1950) is a former professional baseball player. Yount (whose younger brother is Hall of Famer Robin Yount) shares the unique distinction of being one of two pitchers in Major League Baseball (MLB) history to appear in the official record books without ever actually having faced a batter. In his only major league appearance—on September 15, 1971—he had to leave the game during his warm-up pitches due to injury.

Early career
Yount went to Taft High School in Woodland Hills, California, and was a fifth round draft pick in the 1968 Major League Baseball Draft. He impressed in the Carolina League in both 1968 and 1969 (he had a 2.25 ERA in 1969), and was invited to spring training at the major league camp in 1970 and 1971. After a strong stint with the Astros' AAA affiliate in Oklahoma City, Yount was called up on September 2, 1971. Before he could join the big-league club, however, he had to serve a week-long stint in the military, which he later claimed tightened up his elbow.

Houston and beyond
With the Astros trailing the Atlanta Braves 4–1 in the Astrodome on September 15, 1971, Yount was summoned to pitch the ninth inning. While warming up, however, Yount's elbow began to stiffen. "I went to the mound and took a couple of tosses," he later said, "but (the elbow) continued to hurt, so I came out." MLB rules state that any pitcher announced as being in the game must face at least one batter, except in case of injury. Since he was announced, Yount was credited for having played that one game, even though he did not actually face a batter. Yount is one of 31 pitchers—including Hall of Fame batter Stan Musial—to pitch at least one game in the majors with zero innings pitched; that is, they did not retire a batter. In addition, Yount is the only pitcher in major league history to be credited with zero batters faced. Yount went back to the bench, then back to the minors. In spring training in 1972, he was one of the last players cut.

Yount continued to play in the Astros organization until the end of the 1973 season. At the end of spring training, 1974, he was traded along with another minor leaguer to the Milwaukee Brewers for outfielder Wilbur Howard. He was briefly in camp with his younger brother Robin, who was trying to make the squad as a rookie, but was quickly sent back to the minors.

The elder Yount retired after eight minor league seasons in 1976, later becoming a successful real estate developer in Arizona.

Younger Younts
Larry's son Austin Yount was drafted in the 12th round by the Los Angeles Dodgers in 2008. He had a solid year with the rookie-league Ogden Raptors that year, batting .301. His average slipped to .257 with Odgen in 2009, however, and plummeted to .152 in 2010. In 2011, Austin Yount played for the Winston-Salem Dash, a Class A affiliate in the Chicago White Sox organization, where he batted .214; he has not appeared on a pro baseball roster since.

Meanwhile, Larry's nephew (and Robin's son) Dustin Yount played ten years in the Orioles and Dodgers organizations (and was a teammate of Austin's at Inland Empire in 2010), but never made it past AA ball, with a career batting average of .261.

Bibliography
Tellis, Richard, Once Around The Bases, Triumph Books, Chicago, 1998, pp. 279–284.

References

External links

1950 births
Living people
Major League Baseball pitchers
Houston Astros players
Greensboro Patriots players
Oklahoma City 89ers players
Peninsula Astros players
Columbus Astros players
Denver Bears players
Burlington Bees players
Thetford Mines Miners players
Navegantes del Magallanes players
American expatriate baseball players in Venezuela
Baseball players from Houston
William Howard Taft Charter High School alumni
American real estate businesspeople